Santa Giustina di Venezia is a deconsecrated, former Roman Catholic church building in the sestiere of Castello, Venice.

History
It was initially rebuilt in the second half of the 15th century by Augustinian nuns. The Convent was suppressed in 1896. The façade is garlanded with Istrian marble,  and was initially commissioned by the procurator of St. Mark, Giovanni Soranzo, who asked Baldassare Longhena to design and rebuild the church in a Baroque-style in 1636-77.

References
Rizzoli guide, The Treasures of Venice (2004) Antonio Manno.

Baroque architecture in Venice
Roman Catholic churches completed in 1677
17th-century Roman Catholic church buildings in Italy
Roman Catholic churches in Venice
Baldassare Longhena buildings
1677 establishments in Italy